This is a round-up of the 1968 Sligo Senior Football Championship. St. Patrick's Dromard, led by Sligo star Micheal Kearins, were crowned champions for the first time, after a win over their West Sligo rivals Easkey in the final.

Quarter-finals

Semi-finals

Sligo Senior Football Championship Final

References

 Sligo Champion (Autumn 1968)

Sligo Senior Football Championship
Sligo